The Hammerskins (also known as Hammerskin Nation) are a white supremacist group formed in 1988 in Dallas, Texas. Their primary focus is the production and promotion of white power rock music,  and many white power bands have been affiliated with the group. The Hammerskins were affiliated with the record label 9% Productions. The Hammerskins host several annual concerts, including Hammerfest, an annual event in both the United States and Europe in honor of deceased Hammerskin Joe Rowan, the lead singer of the band Nordic Thunder.

The Hammerskins were one of the most prominent American white power skinhead groups. The Anti-Defamation League describes them as the United States' best-organized neo-Nazi skinhead group, with the Hammerskin Nation website boasting six chapters in the United States and chapters existing in Canada, various European countries, New Zealand, and Australia. The organization is self-described as "leaderless". Individual members have been involved in many violent attacks and hate crimes, mostly in the US (notably the Wisconsin Sikh temple shooting), although these have not been organized by the group.

It maintains an active recruitment strategy, and encourages members to enlist in military forces in order to learn combat skills for an upcoming race war. Its website is defunct. It has run Facebook groups under the name Crew 38 (now inactive) and its online forums, and this name is also used for supporters of the group in Australia.

History
The Hammerskins emerged in the late 1980s from the Dallas based Confederate Hammerskins. Their name is based on a scene in the 1982 film Pink Floyd – The Wall.

The first international chapters of the group were formed in Northern Ireland and Switzerland in 1990, and Australian and Canadian chapters followed in 1993. During the following year, the regional groups amalgamated, rebranding as Hammerskin Nation, but in 1999 reverted to the regional system under an international umbrella.

Power struggles had split the group into several factions by 2008. The website and online forums went offline in 2001 with little explanation, and not long afterwards, the white supremacist Tom Metzger announced the termination of the group known as Hammerskin Nation. However, another "official" Hammerskin Nation website was launched in 2002, which was still active as of October 2018 but without online forums, but was inactive by April 2020.

Description

The organization is self-described as "leaderless". It maintains an active recruitment strategy, and encourages members to enlist in military forces in order to learn combat skills for an upcoming race war.

Symbolism and motto
The Hammerskins logo, depicting two claw hammers crossed, is based on a fictitious neo-Nazi organization depicted in the 1982 film Pink Floyd – The Wall. The portrayal of the fictional group in the film was intended to show Nazism negatively. Their logo and the motto "Hammerskins forever, forever hammerskins" ("H.F.F.H.") often appear in their paraphernalia and tattoos. Crew 38 and Hammerskins members also frequently identify themselves with the slogan "838", meaning "hail [the] crossed hammers" (the initialism H.C.H. translates into the eighth, third and eighth letters of the alphabet).

As of October 12, 2018, their website showed six U.S. chapters: West, Northwest, Midland, Confederate, Northern, and Eastern, and chapters in Australia, Canada, France, Germany, Hungary, Italy, New Zealand, Portugal, Spain, Sweden, Luxembourg, and Switzerland.

United States
Individual members have been involved in many violent attacks and hate crimes, mostly in the US, although these have not been organized by the group.

Many Outlaw Hammerskins members attended the 2002 NordicFest, and the group was planning to provide security for a white pride festival hosted by the National Knights of the Ku Klux Klan. The Outlaw Hammerskins are now defunct.

Many of its members have been convicted of harassment, assault and even murder. On August 5, 2012, Hammerskin Wade Michael Page was shot by police and died of a self-inflicted gunshot wound to the head after he killed six people in a Sikh temple in Oak Creek, Wisconsin. Page had become a "fully patched" member of the Hammerskins in autumn 2011, according to the Anti-Defamation League. He played in at least three Hammerskin-affiliated bands; End Apathy, Definite Hate and 13 Knots. According to media sources and civil rights organizations, End Apathy, Wade's main band, had played at several recent Hammerskin events in the United States prior to the shooting-spree.

Southern Cross Hammerskins (Australia)
The Australian group, founded in 1993, is known as the Southern Cross Hammerskins. In 2014 they were reported to be active in Melbourne, Brisbane, Gold Coast, Sydney and Adelaide, with a focus on anti-Asian and anti-Muslim sentiment. A support group called Crew 38 was created in 2009, for those who were unable to commit to full membership.

In October 2019, the Southern Cross Hammerskins along with Blood & Honour Australia held the annual Ian Stuart Donaldson Memorial Concert in Melbourne. Various human rights, faith, trade union and anti-discrimination groups lobbied the Victorian Government to stop the concert, to no avail, and it went ahead as intended.

See also
Vinlanders Social Club
List of neo-Nazi bands

References

External links
Official website

1988 establishments in Texas
Neo-Nazi organizations
Neo-Nazi organizations in the United States
Neo-Nazism in Australia
Neo-Nazi musical groups
Organizations established in 1988
White nationalism in Texas